Ted Key (born Anthony Matthew Key, 1 July 1960, Hull, East Riding of Yorkshire, England) was the original bassist in The Housemartins. He was replaced in 1985 by Norman Cook.

Key originally played with a local band called The Gargoyles and continues to be involved in the Hull music scene and is the frontman of Ted Key and the Kingstons.

Key taught mathematics at Hull College.  He is married to a BBC Radio Humberside producer Katy Noone and has two sons.

References

External links
Official website

1960 births
Living people
The Housemartins members
English rock bass guitarists
Male bass guitarists
English songwriters
English male guitarists
Musicians from Kingston upon Hull
British male songwriters